Montgomery Opera House, also known as Clark County Savings Bank and Kahoka State Bank, is a historic opera house located at Kahoka, Clark County, Missouri. It was built in 1890, and is a two-story, Late Victorian style brick building. The building features a high hipped roof, elaborate pressed metal cornice, and finely detailed brick work.

It was listed on the National Register of Historic Places in 1988.

References

Commercial buildings on the National Register of Historic Places in Missouri
Victorian architecture in Missouri
Commercial buildings completed in 1890
Buildings and structures in Clark County, Missouri
National Register of Historic Places in Clark County, Missouri
1890 establishments in Missouri